Aydınkaya, formerly and still informally known as Kantara, is a village in the Oğuzeli District, Gaziantep Province, Turkey.

References

Villages in Oğuzeli District